Karmayogi is a 2012 Malayalam film directed by V. K. Prakash, starring Indrajith, Nithya Menon, Padmini Kolhapure, Saiju Kurup, Ashokan, Thalaivasal Vijay and Manikuttan. The film's screenplay is written by Balram Mattannur. It is an adaptation of Shakespeare's Hamlet. Indrajith plays the protagonist in the film.

Plot
The film tells the story of Rudran Gurukkal, the lone male descendant of the Chathothu family. The family represents the Yogi community, in which Lord Shiva is believed to have been born. Rudran is haunted by a strange kind of destiny. This forms the crux of the story.

Accolades
 Karmayogi was screened in the competition section at the 42nd International Film Festival of India (IFFI), in Panaji, Goa in 2011.
 Karmayogi was screened in the Malayalam Cinema Today section at the 16th International Film Festival of Kerala (IFFK), in Thiruvananthapuram, Kerala in 2011.
 Risabava won the 2011 Kerala State Awards for dubbing for his work in the film.

Cast
 Indrajith as Rudran Gurukkal
 Nithya Menon
 Padmini Kolhapure as Mankamma, Rudran's mother
 Saiju Kurup
 Ashokan
 Thalaivasal Vijay
 Manikuttan
 Anoop Sankar
 Kani Kusruti
M. R. Gopakumar

References

External links

Karmayogi film stills and posters

2010s Malayalam-language films
2012 films
Films based on Hamlet
Modern adaptations of works by William Shakespeare
Kalarippayattu films
Films scored by Ouseppachan
Films directed by V. K. Prakash